Day Trip may refer to:
 Day Trip (album), a 2008 album by Pat Metheny
 Day Trip (film), a 2012 South Korean short film
 day trip
 Daytrip (company), a startup transportation network company